The Maroon Formation is a geologic formation in Colorado. It preserves fossils dating back to the Permian period. It is the primary formation of sandstone that lends the vivid red color to the hills around Glenwood Springs, Colorado.

See also

 List of fossiliferous stratigraphic units in Colorado
 Paleontology in Colorado

References
 
 

Geologic formations of Colorado
Permian System of North America